Agee Creek is a stream in Butler County, Missouri, USA.

Agee Creek was named after William Agee, a pioneer citizen.

See also
List of rivers of Missouri

References

Rivers of Butler County, Missouri
Rivers of Missouri
Arkansas–White–Red water resource region